Damjan Vtič (born 13 May 1985) is a Slovenian skier. He competed in the Nordic combined event at the 2006 Winter Olympics.

References

1985 births
Living people
Slovenian male Nordic combined skiers
Olympic Nordic combined skiers of Slovenia
Nordic combined skiers at the 2006 Winter Olympics
People from Trebnje
21st-century Slovenian people